Maassab is a 2018 Hindi feature film on education in rural primary schools in India. Shiva Suryavanshi who is playing the male protagonist is making his acting debut. Sheetal Singh is playing female lead, while Kritika Singh, Narmadeshwar Dubey, Chandrabhushan Singh, Mannveer Choudharry play supporting roles. Actor Aditya Om is director of the movie.

The film premiered at the 2018 Cosmic Film Festival in Orlando, Florida, and was released in Indian on 29 January 2021.

Story
In Maassab the untouched topic of education in rural primary schools in India is explored in a unique manner. Real 
education can be defined as the pillar of a secure, sensitive, and prosperous society. In the film, an attempt is made to 
highlight the challenges and resistance that rural India faces even today as it confronts education reforms.

Cast
 Shiva Suryavanshi as Ashish Kumar
 Sheetal Singh as Usha Devi
Brijeshwar Singh as Jitendra
 Sohit Soni as Nanhey 
 
 Kritika Singh as Rama Devi
 ChandraBhushan Singh as Mahendra Yadav
 Manveer Choudhary as Awdhesh Kumar

Awards
Maassab screened and won awards in many national and International film festivals.

 Finalist Best Actor (Shiva Suryavanshi): Cosmic Film Festival, Orlando, Florida, USA, 2018
 Winner Best Actor (Shiva Suryavanshi): Rajasthan International Film Festival, Jaipur, 2018
 Special appreciation director award (Aditya Om): Rajasthan international film festival, Jaipur, 2018
 Winner Best inspirational Film: Jharkhand International film festival awards, Ranchi, 2018
 Winner Best Director (Aditya Om): Ahamedabad International children film festival, Ahmedabad
 Official Selection: Kolkata international film festival, Kolkata, 2018
 Official Selection: Jagran film festival, Mumbai, 2018
 Official selection: Guwahati International film Festival

References

External links
 Maassab at Koimoi 
 
 Maassab at FIlmibeat

2018 films